Flender Werke was a German shipbuilding company, located in Lübeck. It was founded in 1917 as a branch of Brückenbau Flender AG of Benrath on the Rhine.  In 1926 it was made a fully independent business and renamed Lübecker Flenderwerke AG.  It went on to become one of the largest shipyards in Germany, building nearly 700 ships in all.

During World War II, Flender Werke built 2 Type II and 40 Type VII U-boats for the Kriegsmarine.

After the war, Flender Werke continued to build merchant ships, and in 1973 were renamed Flender Werft AG.  In 2002 they were forced to close because of insolvency.

References

External links
 

Shipbuilding companies of Germany
Manufacturing companies established in 1917
Defunct companies of Germany
History of Lübeck
German companies established in 1917
Manufacturing companies disestablished in 2002
Port of Lübeck
German companies disestablished in 2002